Vikramadithyan is a 2014 Indian Malayalam-language comedy-drama film co-produced and directed by Lal Jose. The film stars Dulquer Salman and Unni mukundan. Nivin Pauly did a cameo appearance in the film. The screenplay is by Iqbal Kuttippuram, while Jomon T. John handles the cinematography. The music is composed by Bijibal. The film was released on 25 July 2014 on the occasion of Eid-ul Fitr.

Plot
Kunjunni Menon, a witty thief, loves Lakshmi, a police constable. While following her one-day, he finds out that she wishes to marry a policeman. Vasudeva Shenoy, Laksmi's colleague expresses his desire to marry her, despite his mother's objections. Kunjunni poses as a police constable and manages to marry Lakshmi before Shenoy can convince his mother. Shenoy then gets married, and both couples are blessed with baby boys on the same day. Lakshmi finds out that Kunjunni had cheated her, but they pretend to have an amicable marriage. A young Adithyan still believes his father to be a policeman, where he and Vikram become rivals in school and start competing with each other; wagering that the loser should salute the winner, a habit they then carry into adulthood. Adithyan always ends up losing.

One day, Kunjunni is caught red-handed by Shenoy and his team while attempting a theft and is paraded half-naked throughout the street. Unable to face a distraught Adithyan and berated by Lakshmi, Kunjunni reaches a bridge and commits suicide. Years later, Vikram grows up into a hard-working young man while Adithyan becomes quite lazy and does petty illegal activities to gain some pocket money. Adithyan falls in love with Deepika, who is Vikram close friend. Once the duo passes their degrees, both decide to apply for the SI selection test. Though the two share a healthy rivalry, Shenoy is spiteful towards Adithyan, who outranks Vikram in the preliminary round. However, Vikram acknowledges Adithyan's superior intellect displaying his deep respect for his rival. 

Shenoy is able to trap Adithyan in a narcotics case and desperate to put him behind bars, where he also guards the evidence personally, but Adithyan is saved when Vikram secretly swaps the evidence with Lactose powder and Adithyan expresses his gratitude, revealing that the respect they hold is mutual. In a final attempt, Shenoy convinces Lakshmi that he was the one who swapped in evidence and asks her for a favor in return. Lakshmi hides the interview memo Adithyan was to receive and only Vikram's name appears on the list for the final exam. A heartbroken Adithyan blames Lakshmi for Kunjunni's death and claims that she could have changed him had she tried. Adithyan disappears that night. 

Years later, Vikram became an SI and took charge on the day of Shenoy's retirement. Among the notable guests, new sub-collector Lokesh joins as a surprise to wish the father-son duo. Lokesh reveals that he met Adithyan on a train journey to Delhi and stopped him from committing suicide. The two later became close friends and roommates. On Lokesh's insistence, Adithyan prepared for the UPSC exams while doing odds jobs in between. Both of them cleared the exam together and Lokesh further reveals that Adithyan is now an ACP, Shenoy's and Vikram's superior. Shenoy is forced to accept defeat and salute Adithyan. 

Satisfied with his revenge, Adithyan decides not to tell Vikram. Vikram manages to find out and salutes Adithyan publicly. The two embrace and acknowledge their friendship. Vikram asks Adithyan to accept Deepika and reveals that his next goal will be to catch up with Adithyan.

Cast

 Dulquer Salman as ACP Adithyan Menon IPS aka Aadhi
Unni mukundan as SI Vikram Shenoy aka Vikraman
 Namitha Pramod as Deepika Pai
 Nivin Pauly as Sub Collector Lokesh Kumar IAS 
 Anoop Menon as CI Vasudeva Shenoy, Vikraman's father
 Lena as Police Constable Lakshmi Nair, Adithyan's mother
 Santhosh Keezhattoor as Kunjunni Menon, Adithyan's father
 Charmila as Vikraman's Mother
 Joy Mathew as Dr. Ramanath Pai, Deepika's father
 Sadiq as ASI Raviettan, a police officer who is supportive of Adithyan 
 Sidhartha Siva as Advocate Santhosh, Kunjunni's friend
 Irshad (actor) as George Alexander, ACP Narcotics Buiero
 Liimal G Padath as Vikram Shenoy's Friend 
 Jiyad Irani as Harbinder 
 Gautam Pisharody as Samar
 Sana Althaf as Adhithyan's sister
 Manju Satheesh as Deepika's mother
 Cherthala Lalitha as Lakshmi's mother
 Suja Menon as TV Reporter
 Master Ilhan as young Adithyan
 Bindu Varappuzha
 Chethan Jayalal

Release and reception
The film was released on 25 July 2014 on the occasion of Eid-ul Fitr.

Critical reception
Dalton L of Deccan Chronicle rated the film 3 in a scale of 5 and concluded his review saying: "Lal Jose’s nonlinear romantic love triangle may be somewhat idealistic in nature. However, it’s a compelling entertainer that extols the virtues of education, work, perseverance, and the struggle for goodness; and inspires one to compete with nothing but the highest order." Nicy V. P of the International Business Times praised the script and called the film a perfect, well crafted flick for Eid and gave the film four stars on five. Paresh C. Palicha of Rediff wrote, "Vikramadityan is entertaining but with little depth."

P. Sanalkumar of Kerala Kaumudi was however, critical of the film and called the film's script "weak" and was critical about the film's cinematography and acting by Anoop Menon. He concluded the review saying that the film is reserved only for those who are "meek and lowly in spirit".

Box office 
The film was a commercial success, grossing approximately 11.5 crores in Kerala.  The film collected 34,767 from UK box office. The film collected $23,799 (₹14.53 lakhs) from US box office in its eight-week run. The film ran over 100 days in theatres.

Soundtrack

Awards
 2014 Kerala State Film Awards

 Second Best Actor – Anoop Menon
Best Choreography  - Sajna Najam

Sequel
In August 2022, Director Lal Jose said in an interview with the Zee Malayalam News that there will be a sequel to Vikramadithyan.

References

External links
 

2014 films
2010s Malayalam-language films
2010s coming-of-age drama films
Indian coming-of-age drama films
Films directed by Lal Jose